Ernst David Bergmann (1903 – April 6, 1975) was an Israeli nuclear scientist and chemist. He is often considered the father of the Israeli nuclear program.

Biography
Ernst David Bergmann was born in Germany, His father, Judah Bergmann, was a rabbi. He studied chemistry at the University of Berlin under Wilhelm Schlenk. He was awarded his Ph.D. in 1927. Bergmann continued to work at the university and wrote the "Comprehensive Manual of Organic Chemistry" (Ausführliches Lehrbuch der Organischen Chemie) together with Schlenk. The two-volume manual was published in 1932 and 1939, respectively; however, because Bergmann was Jewish his name to be removed from the title page of the second volume.

Bergmann left for London in 1933 soon after the Nazis came to power, and began work with chemist and Zionist leader Chaim Weizmann. He turned down an offer of a position at Oxford from Sir Robert Robinson, an event that Sir Robinson recalled years later with anger.

Bergmann left Europe less than a year later. He immigrated to Mandatory Palestine on January 1, 1934, to work at the Daniel Sieff Research Institute in Rehovot.  During World War II he worked on defense projects for the French, English, and Americans. A year after the war, Bergmann returned to Sieff Institute, which went on to become the Weizmann Institute of Science.

Bergmann was married to the chemist Ottilie Blum.

Scientific career
During the next several years Bergmann, who had become famous through his work and connection with Weizmann, became close friends with David Ben-Gurion, and was appointed to several prominent government positions: chief of the Israel Defense Forces' science department in August 1948, science adviser to minister of defense on July 15, 1951, and director of research of the Division of Research and Infrastructure of the Ministry of Defense in early 1952.  In June 1952, he was appointed by Prime Minister David Ben-Gurion to be the first chairman of the Israel Atomic Energy Commission (IAEC), where he played a crucial role in leading the Israel nuclear program with Ben-Gurion and Defense Minister Shimon Peres.

That same year, he left the Weizmann Institute to become the chair of organic chemistry at the Hebrew University of Jerusalem, and worked with graduate students for the next two years at Technion in Haifa.

Bergmann's work at the IAEC was shrouded in secrecy, and the agency itself was unknown to the public until he revealed its existence in 1954. Bergmann offered to resign in June 1964 after Ben-Gurion had been replaced by Levi Eshkol, but was convinced to remain for two more years.  He resigned as chair of the IAEC and the two defense ministry posts on April 1, 1966.

During his lifetime Bergmann published more than 500 peer reviewed scientific papers in international journals, and made critical contributions to fluorine chemistry.

Awards and recognition
In 1968, Bergmann was awarded the Israel Prize in life sciences.

See also
 List of Israel Prize recipients

References

External links
   Weintraub, B. Bulletin of the Israel Chemical Society

1903 births
1975 deaths
Academic staff of the Hebrew University of Jerusalem
Israel Prize in life sciences recipients
Israel Prize in life sciences recipients who were chemists
Israeli chemists
Israeli nuclear development
Israel Defense Prize recipients
Academic staff of Weizmann Institute of Science
Members of the Israel Academy of Sciences and Humanities
Humboldt University of Berlin alumni
Jewish emigrants from Nazi Germany to Mandatory Palestine